Mustapha Heddane is an Algerian football manager. He has managed teams in the Algerian Ligue Professionnelle 1 and the Algerian Ligue Professionnelle 2.

Titles
As a coach
Algerian Cup in 1997 with USM Alger

References

Year of birth missing (living people)
Living people
Algerian football managers
CR Belouizdad managers
USM Alger managers
USM El Harrach managers
MC Alger managers
CA Batna managers
Algeria under-23 international managers
ES Mostaganem managers
MC Saïda managers
Olympique de Médéa managers
JSM Béjaïa managers
21st-century Algerian people